Halevi (the Levite or of Levi) may refer to:
The prefix "ה" (HAY), in the Hebrew language, means the. "HaLevi" means THE Levite.
 Someone whose family name is Halevi

As a title
 Rabbi Yechezkel Levenstein was a Levi
 Rabbi Yisroel Belsky was a Levi
Rabbi Baruch ha-Levi Epstein (1860–1941), a Lithuanian rabbi

Some more examples of having the title HaLevi, but not in their last name are:

As a family name
Some people whose family name is Halevi are:

Rabbi Abraham ibn Daud ha-Levi
Rabbi Aaron ben Abba ha-Levi ben Johanan
Rabbi Aharon HaLevi (1235 – c. 1290)
Adolf Abraham Halevi Fraenkel
Rabbi David HaLevi Segal
Daniel Halévy, French historian
Efraim Halevy (born 1934)
Élie Halévy, French philosopher and historian
Élie Halévy (Chalfan), French Hebrew poet and author
Rabbi Eliezer ben Joel HaLevi
Fromental Halévy, French composer
Geneviève Halévy, French salonnière, daughter of Fromental Halévy and wife of Georges Bizet.
Herzl Halevi, Major General, Israel Defence Forces, Director of Israeli Military Intelligence.
Ilan Halevi (1943–2013), French-Israeli Jewish pro-Palestinian journalist and politician 
Joseph Halévy, French Orientalist (Hebraist) and traveller
Léon Halévy, French author and dramatic writer; brother of Jacques François Fromental Halévy
Louise Halévy, a character in Mobile Suit Gundam 00
Ludovic Halévy, French dramatist
Moses Isaac Ha-Levi Horowitz
Odelya Halevi, Israeli actress
Rabbi Samuel Neta HaLevi
Shai Halevi, Israeli computer scientist
 Tzachi Halevy (born 1975), Israeli film and television actor and singer
Rabbi Yehuda Halevi
 Rabbi Yihya Yitzhak Halevi
Rabbi Yitzhak HaLevi Herzog 
Rabbi Yitzhak Isaac Halevy Rabinowitz, Jewish historian, and founder of the Agudath Israel organization.
Rabbi Yitzhak HaLevi ben Mordechai Raitzes, Polish Rabbi 
Rabbi Yosef Zvi HaLevy (1874–1960), Israeli rabbi
Yossi Klein Halevi (born 1953), American author, journalist and researcher of Israeli culture
Rabbi Zerachiah ha-Levi of Girona (1115-1186)
Saadia Kobashi (1904–1990), the Levite Yemenite Jewish leader who signed the Israeli Declaration of Independence using using the name "Saadia Kobashi HaLevi".

References

Hebrew-language surnames
Jewish surnames
Levite surnames